Line 5 is a rapid transit line of the Kunming Metro, serving the city of Kunming, Yunnan Province, China. Phase 1 of the line was opened on 29 June 2022.

History 
Construction began in June 2016. The line is constructed by a consortium consisting of China Railway Construction Corp, Fourth Railway Research Institute Investment Co, and Kunming Railway Group.

Opening timeline

Rolling stock 
The line is operated using six-car Type B trainsets produced by CRRC, with a maximum speed of 80 km/h and a capacity for 2094 passengers.

Stations

References

05